Solignac is a commune in the Haute-Vienne department in the Nouvelle-Aquitaine region in west-central France.

Geography
The village lies on the right bank of the Briance, which flows westward through the commune. It contains the former Abbey of Solignac, part of the Benedictine order; founded in 631 and rebuilt several times, the current buildings date from the 17th century. Suppressed during the French Revolution and used as a porcelain factory until 1931, the former Abbey church is known as an exceptional example of Romanesque architecture and has been designated a National Historic Monument. On 1st of August, 2021 the community of Benedictine monks returned to the abbey and will be an active religious site once again. 

Solignac-Le Vigen station has rail connections to Brive-la-Gaillarde and Limoges. Inhabitants are known as Solignacois in French.

Personalities
 St Ramaclus, 7th-century monk who was the first abbot at Solignac Abbey.
 Joseph Brousseau, French architect probably born at Solignac around 1733 and died at Sées in the Orne on 5 February 1797.
 Georges d'Aubusson de La Feuillade (1609-1697), later Bishop of Embrun and Bishop of Metz was a member and later Abbot of Solignac Abbey, from 1639 to 1649;

See also
 Communes of the Haute-Vienne department

References

External links
 COMMUNE SOLIGNAC PHOTO GALLERY

Communes of Haute-Vienne